The North American Building is an , 21-story, historic high-rise building at 121 South Broad Street in Philadelphia, Pennsylvania. The building was designed by Philadelphia architect James H. Windrim (1840–1919) as the headquarters of the newspaper The North American and commissioned by Thomas B. Wanamaker, the newspaper's publisher and son of John Wanamaker, the department store founder.

See also

List of tallest buildings in Philadelphia

References

External links
"A Brief History of the Illuminated Buildings Along the Avenue of the Arts", by Fatima Adamu, Project Coordinator, Center City District.
Listing and photographs at Philadelphia Architects and Buildings

Skyscraper office buildings in Philadelphia
Art Nouveau architecture in Pennsylvania
Art Nouveau commercial buildings
Office buildings completed in 1900
Chicago school architecture in Pennsylvania